Henry Clay Baldwin (June 13, 1894 – February 24, 1964) nicknamed "Ted", was a Major League Baseball infielder. In 6 career games, he had five career hits in 16 career at-bats. He batted and threw right-handed. Balwin attended Swarthmore College.

Baldwin was born in Chadds Ford, Pennsylvania and died in West Chester, Pennsylvania.

References

External links 

1894 births
1964 deaths
Philadelphia Phillies players
Major League Baseball infielders
Baseball players from Pennsylvania
West Chester Golden Rams baseball players
People from Chadds Ford Township, Pennsylvania